Supplanaxis nucleus, common name the black Atlantic planaxis, is a species of small sea snail, a marine gastropod mollusk in the family Planaxidae.

Distribution
This species occurs in the Caribbean Sea, the Gulf of Mexico and off the Lesser Antilles.

Description 
The maximum recorded shell length is 17 mm.

Habitat 
Minimum recorded depth is 0 m. Maximum recorded depth is 3 m.

References

 Rosenberg, G.; Moretzsohn, F.; García, E. F. (2009). Gastropoda (Mollusca) of the Gulf of Mexico, Pp. 579–699 in: Felder, D.L. and D.K. Camp (eds.), Gulf of Mexico–Origins, Waters, and Biota. Texas A&M Press, College Station, Texas.

External links
 

Planaxidae
Gastropods described in 1789